On 9 September 1349, an earthquake sequence began in Italy's Apennine Mountains that severely affected the regions of Molise, Latium and Abruzzo. Probably four moderate-large earthquakes devastated towns and villages across the central Italian Peninsula, with damage even reported in Rome. These earthquakes originated from the Apennine fold and thrust belt fault network, with the first and most destructive shock's epicenter originating from the north-west Campania region. Paleoseismological data gathered from scarping, fault length, and collapsed sections of Venafro's Roman aqueduct indicates the epicenter of the main shock was likely along the Aquae Iuliae fault. The fault suspected of causing this earthquake occurred on the Aqua Iuliae fault along the Molise-Campania border.

Earthquakes 
The first earthquake, with an estimated magnitude of 6.7, struck on 9 September in the north-west Campania southeast of the Molisano town of Venafro. The second quake struck on 10 of September near L'Aquila. Both quakes caused widespread damage to not just towns and cities but infrastructure like Roman aqueducts and bridges. The poet Petrarch describes damage in Rome to the city's monuments. The western side of the four-story Flavian Amphitheatre collapsed towards the caelian hills, leaving a massive mound of travertine and tufa rubble Rome later quarried for construction materials.

Aftermath 
The town of L'Aquila has been described as being almost "completely destroyed."

References 

1349
Earthquakes in Italy
14th-century earthquakes
14th century in Italy
Disasters in Abruzzo
Medieval Abruzzo